Cape Raper is a peninsula on eastern Baffin Island, Qikiqtaaluk Region, Nunavut, Canada.

References

Peninsulas of Baffin Island